Leap Year is an American silent comedy film directed by and starring Roscoe Arbuckle. Though produced in 1921, the film was not released in the United States due to Arbuckle's involvement in the Virginia Rappe death scandal; it received its first release in Finland in 1924. The film finally saw an American release of sorts in 1981. Prints are held by the UCLA Film and Television Archive and Library of Congress.

Plot summary
Roscoe Arbuckle plays Stanley Piper, heir to his uncle’s millions. He lives at Piper Hall. His valet is Mumford. Inside the house, Jeremiah Piper, Stanley’s uncle, who is gouty, grouchy and a girl-hater, is being looked after by his nurse, Phyllis Brown. He decides to send Stanley on a fishing trip to keep him away from women as he falls in love with every woman he meets. The ‘fool nephew,’ stutters when he’s excited and is relived only by drink (water). Nurse Brown is upset to hear this news. 
	Stanley brings flowers for Nurse Brown only to be told by his uncle that she’s been fired. He catches her as she’s about to leave the house. She tells him what his uncle has said about Stanley falling in love with every woman he meets. Stanley is unable to state is case, his stutter making him momentarily speechless until Mumford gives him water when he tells her it’s a base falsehood and he can prove it. If he can prove it, she decides, they can be together. 
	While he’s trying to prove his love for Nurse Brown, he inadvertently ends up engaged to three different women and must extricate himself from all three engagements by pretending to be seriously ill and suffering from fits. When this doesn’t work, fate intervenes, and the three women find welcome distractions in the form of the other characters.

Cast
 Roscoe 'Fatty' Arbuckle as Stanley Piper
 Mary Thurman as Nurse Phyllis Brown
 Lucien Littlefield as Jeremiah Piper
 Clarence Geldart as Scott Travis
 Harriet Hammond as Loris Keene
 Allen Durnell as Tommy Blaine
 Gertrude Short as Molly Morris
 John McKinnon as Mumford, the valet
 Maude Wayne as Irene Rutherford
 Winifred Greenwood as Mrs. Travis

See also
 Fatty Arbuckle filmography

References

External links
 
 
 
 Leap Year available for free download at Internet Archive

1924 films
1924 comedy films
Silent American comedy films
American silent feature films
American black-and-white films
Films directed by Roscoe Arbuckle
Films directed by James Cruze
Paramount Pictures films
1920s American films